Thriprayar is a town in Thrissur District of Kerala, India. It is famous for the Thriprayar Temple. It is a part of Thrissur Metropolitan Area. It has one of the 4 temples which is visited in Nalambalam Yatra(Rama-Bharta-Lakshmana-Shaturghna).

History
The Thriprayar Temple was originally under the domain of the Zamorins, rulers of Calicut. It later came under the possession of the Dutch, then Mysore Sultans and the rulers of Cochin. Now it is one of the several temples  governed by Cochin Devaswom Board.

Geography
The town is centered on the Sree Rama Temple (Thriprayar Temple) Triprayar is about 23 km away from Guruvayoor Sri Krishna temple and 20 km away from Irinjalakuda temple, Kodungallur temple is 24 km away. The nearest railhead is Thrissur, 22 km east of the temple.

Tourist attractions

 Aneswaram Siva Temple, Chemmappilly
 Y Mall, Triprayar
 Sneha theeram

Educational institutions
 Sree Narayana College, Nattika
 Sree Narayana Guru College Of Advanced Studies, Nattika 
 [Sree Rama Govt. Polytechnic College], Triprayar 
A.U.P.S Thripryar

Villages and suburbs
 Nattika
 Valapad
 Vadanappally

See also 
 Sree Narayana College, Nattika
 Sree Narayana Guru College Of Advanced Studies, Nattika

References

Cities and towns in Thrissur district